Juan Ignacio Londero was the defending champion, but lost to Laslo Đere in the quarterfinals.

Cristian Garín won the title, defeating Diego Schwartzman in the final, 2–6, 6–4, 6–0.

Seeds
The top four seeds received a bye into the second round.

Draw

Finals

Top half

Bottom half

Qualifying

Seeds

Qualifiers

Lucky losers

Qualifying draw

First qualifier

Second qualifier

Third qualifier

Fourth qualifier

References

External links
 Main draw
 Qualifying draw

2020 Singles
2020 ATP Tour
2020 in Argentine tennis